Lago di Magazzolo, or Lago Castello, is a lake in the Province of Agrigento, Sicily, Italy.

The ruins of the Castello della Pietra d'Amico are located near the lake.

References

Lakes of Sicily